A Session of the Painting Jury is an oil on canvas painting by the French artist Henri Gervex, probably undertaken in 1885. The painting, a piece of official art during the Third Republic, shows a meeting of the painting jury of the Salon, the official exhibition of the Académie des Beaux-Arts, in 1883.

The picture shows a room on the first floor of the Palais de l'Industrie. Shown in it are several identifiable artists of the time, including Félix-Joseph Barrias, Jean-Joseph Benjamin-Constant, Léon Bonnat, William-Adolphe Bouguereau, Alexandre Cabanel, Carolus-Duran, Gustave Achille Guillaumet and Antoine Vollon, who are involved in judging the works of art shown. In the latter half of the 19th century the Salon was an important and popular institution. The French state would acquire some of the paintings shown in the salon's exhibition, which would be hung in the Musée du Luxembourg.

The painting was exhibited in the Salon in 1885 and was subsequently acquired by Pierre Waldeck-Rousseau, who later became the Prime Minister of France. Waldeck-Rousseau gave the painting to the Musée du Luxembourg in 1892. It subsequently spent time in the Louvre and the Saint-Denis Museum, Reims, before being assigned to the Musée d'Orsay, Paris, in 1981, where it is still held, .

References

Sources

 
 

1883 paintings
Paintings in the collection of the Musée d'Orsay
Paintings about painting